Janet Watt (born 23 March 1952) is a former New Zealand female badminton player. She represented New Zealand at the 1985 Summer Deaflympics held in Los Angeles and she won the gold medal in the Women's doubles badminton event along with Carolyn Hamilin.

References 

1952 births
Living people
Deaf badminton players
New Zealand female badminton players
New Zealand deaf people